Sarvagnanagar is one of the 224 constituencies in the Karnataka Legislative Assembly of Karnataka a south state of India. It is also part of Bangalore Central Lok Sabha constituency.

Member of Legislative Assembly
 2008: K. J. George, Indian National Congress 
 2013:K. J. George , Indian National Congress
 2018: K. J. George , Indian National Congress

See also
 Sarvagnanagar
 Bangalore Urban district
 List of constituencies of Karnataka Legislative Assembly

References

 

Assembly constituencies of Karnataka
Bangalore Urban district